Yamil is a given name. It is a variant of Jamil.  Notable persons with the given name Yamil include:

Yamil Chain-Haddad (born 1995)
Yamil Benítez (born 1972), American baseball player
Yamil Chade ( 1921–2009), Puerto Rican-Lebanese sports team owner and athlete manager
Yamil Adorno or Milo Adorno (born 1977), Puerto Rican actor and writer